The Cisco Bridges are a pair of railroad bridges at Siska (historically known as Cisco) near Lytton, British Columbia, Canada. The Canadian Pacific Railway and Canadian National Railway both follow the route of the Fraser River, one on each side, and the routes exchange sides at this point. The easier CPR route was laid first; when the CNR arrived later they needed to follow the more difficult route. The area is popular with railfans due to the proximity of the two bridges (which allows both bridges to be taken in one photograph, sometimes with a train on each bridge simultaneously), and the easy access to the area (the Trans-Canada Highway, BC Hwy 1) is parallel to both bridges down the east bank of the river. Directional running in the Fraser Canyon means that both CPR and CNR trains may be seen on both bridges.

Canadian National Railway
The north-west end of the bridge abuts into a near-vertical rock face.

Canadian Pacific Railway
The Canadian Pacific bridge is a 3-span,  truss bridge. There are two short Pratt truss spans at each end of the longer Parker truss main span. The south end of the bridge (on the west bank of the river) enters directly into the Cantilever Bar Tunnel, in the side of the Cisco Bluff.

The original span was built by Joseph Tomlinson and was pre-fabricated in England and shipped to Canada in 1883. The bridge – then one of the longest cantilever spans in North America – was then constructed by the San Francisco Bridge Company. When the current bridge was built at Cisco in 1910, the original span was moved to the Esquimalt and Nanaimo Railway on Vancouver Island to cross the Niagara Creek Canyon, where it is still in use (now by the Southern Railway of Vancouver Island).

See also
 List of crossings of the Fraser River
 List of bridges in Canada

References

External links
 
 Photos at railpictures.net

Canadian National Railway bridges in Canada
Canadian Pacific Railway bridges in Canada
Railway bridges in British Columbia
Bridges over the Fraser River
Arch bridges